Tahir Shah (born 27 January 1959) is a Pakistani former first-class cricketer. He is now an umpire and stood in matches in the 2015–16 Quaid-e-Azam Trophy.

References

External links
 

1959 births
Living people
Pakistani cricketers
Pakistani cricket umpires
Lahore cricketers
Cricketers from Lahore